The Culture of Disbelief: How American Law and Politics Trivialize Religious Devotion is a 1994 book by Stephen L. Carter. In it, he holds that religion in the United States is trivialized by American law and politics, and that those with a strong religious faith are forced to bend to meet the viewpoint of a "public faith" which is largely faithless. Carter argues that there is a place for faith in public life, while still adhering to the separation of church and state.

References

External links
Presentation by Carter on The Culture of Disbelief, September 27, 1996, C-SPAN

1994 non-fiction books
Books about politics of the United States
Religious studies books
Works by Stephen L. Carter